Joseph Stéphan (22 July 1928 – 1 February 1985) was a French sprinter who competed in the 1948 Summer Olympics.

References

1928 births
1985 deaths
French male sprinters
Olympic athletes of France
Athletes (track and field) at the 1948 Summer Olympics